Maynard Boyd Dawkins (2 January 1917 – 21 October 1996) was a sheep breeder, choirmaster and politician in the State of South Australia.

History
Dawkins was born in Stirling West the only son of Albert Maynard Dawkins of Gawler River and his wife Mary (née Yeoman). The Dawkins family were early settlers of Gawler, and well known in the area.

He studied at Roseworthy Agricultural College, where his father was a board member, He was, like fellow parliamentarian Leslie Rupert Hart, a breeder of Dorset Horn sheep.

He was president of the Gawler Men's Branch of the Liberal and Country League, and was a successful Liberal candidate for a Midland seat on the Legislative Council in March 1962, successfully made the transition to the new Legislative Council in July 1975 when, by the Act of 1973, the State reverted to voting as one electorate, with proportional representation. He retired in November 1982.

Other interests
Dawkins was a teetotaller; an active member of the Methodist Church and the Band of Hope; following a long family tradition.

He was a fine bass-baritone, a member of the Adelaide Philharmonic Choir, who studied under Clifford Lathlean, and conductor of the notable Gawler Choral Society.

Personal
He married Constance Lilian Wilkinson on 24 August 1943. A son, John Dawkins, born 3 July 1954, followed his father as a member of the Legislative Council from 1997 until 2022. On 8 September 2020, John was elected President of the Legislative Council serving until 19 March 2022.

A nephew also called John was a politician from the Australian Labor Party and was Federal Treasurer in 1991 to 1993.

References 

Members of the South Australian Legislative Council
Australian sheep breeders
1917 births
1996 deaths
Liberal and Country League politicians
20th-century Australian politicians